Charles Roderick Furbush (born April 11, 1986) is an American former professional baseball pitcher. He played in Major League Baseball (MLB) for the Detroit Tigers and Seattle Mariners.

Early life and career
Furbush was born in South Portland, Maine and attended South Portland High School. He went on to St. Joseph's College of Maine, where he was recruited to play at Louisiana State University. In 2005 and 2006, he played collegiate summer baseball for the Hyannis Mets of the Cape Cod Baseball League, where he threw a no-hitter, was named the western division's starting pitcher in the league all-star game, and was named the top New England prospect in 2006. While with Louisiana State in 2007, Furbush went 3–9 with a 4.95 ERA in 16 starts, striking out 88 batters in 87 innings. He was drafted by the Tigers in the fourth round of the 2007 amateur draft and began his professional career that year.

Furbush appeared in 12 games between the GCL Tigers and West Michigan Whitecaps in 2007, making 10 starts and going 6–1 with a 2.34 ERA, striking out 69 batters in  innings. He did not pitch in 2008 due to recovery from Tommy John surgery. With the Lakeland Flying Tigers in 2009, Furbush went 6–7 with a 3.96 ERA in 24 games (23 starts). He split 2010 between the Lakeland Flying Tigers, (13 starts), Erie SeaWolves (five starts) and Toledo Mud Hens (nine starts), going a combined 8–9 with a 4.25 ERA. He struck out 183 batters in 159 innings.

Major league career
On May 21, 2011, Furbush was called up for the first time to replace Brad Thomas who went on the 15-day disabled list with left elbow inflammation. He made his Major League debut on May 23, 2011, after coming into relief for starter Phil Coke who appeared to hurt his ankle slipping on the wet grass after a short start of only  innings pitched and a 1–0 Tigers deficit against the Tampa Bay Rays. Furbush issued a base on balls to the first batter he faced, Sean Rodriguez, to load the bases.  He then struck out Felipe López and Kelly Shoppach to end the inning. He pitched  innings, allowing two hits, one base on balls, and three strikeouts before being replaced by Joaquín Benoit for the start of the eighth inning. The Tigers came back to score two runs under Furbush and eventually won the game 6–3, earning Furbush a win in his first Major League game. On June 30, Furbush was moved to the starting rotation, replacing Phil Coke.

Seattle Mariners

On July 30, 2011, Furbush was traded to the Seattle Mariners along with outfielder Casper Wells, prospect Francisco Martínez and player to be named later Chance Ruffin from the Detroit Tigers for David Pauley and Doug Fister.

On June 8, 2012, he was one of six pitchers who combined for a no-hitter.

On December 17, 2013, Furbush signed a one-year contract extension with the Seattle Mariners. He appeared a career-high 71 games for the 2013 Mariners, posting a 3.74 ERA and compiling 80 strikeouts in 65 innings.

On August 10, 2016, Furbush announced that he would have surgery to fix a partially torn rotator cuff, with an expected recovery time of 12–18 months. He did not pitch in the 2016 season. On November 2, Furbush was outrighted to the minors. After being removed from the 40 man roster, Furbush elected free agency on November 4.

Retirement
On March 7, 2019, Furbush announced his retirement from baseball. In January 2022, it was reported that he was selling advertising time for Seattle radio station ESPN 710 and was said by one 710 staffer to be "a great dude"

Pitching style
Furbush throws a steady mix of five pitches. He leads with a four-seam fastball in the 88–93 mph range, and he has a sinker with similar speed that he throws mostly to right-handed hitters. His main off-speed pitch to lefties is a curveball at 76–79 mph, although he also likes to mix in a slider at 80–85 mph. Against righties, Furbush usually drops the slider in favor of an 80–84 mph changeup. Against hitters from both sides of the plate, Furbush relies heavily on his curveball in 2-strike counts.

References

External links

1986 births
Living people
Detroit Tigers players
Seattle Mariners players
Baseball players from Maine
LSU Tigers baseball players
Major League Baseball pitchers
Sportspeople from South Portland, Maine
Saint Joseph's College of Maine alumni
Hyannis Harbor Hawks players
Gulf Coast Tigers players
West Michigan Whitecaps players
Lakeland Flying Tigers players
Erie SeaWolves players
Toledo Mud Hens players
Tacoma Rainiers players
Everett AquaSox players
South Portland High School alumni